Sandro Galea (born 1971) is a physician, epidemiologist, and author. He is the Robert A. Knox professor and dean at the Boston University School of Public Health. He is the former Chair of Epidemiology at the Columbia University Mailman School of Public Health. Prior to his academic career in public health, Dr. Galea practiced emergency medicine in Canada and served in Somalia with Doctors Without Borders. He was named one of TIME magazine's epidemiology innovators in 2006 and Thomson Reuters listed him as one of the “World's Most Influential Scientific Minds” for the social sciences in 2015. Dr. Galea is past-president of the Society for Epidemiologic Research and an elected member of the American Epidemiological Society. He was elected to the National Academy of Medicine in 2012 and chaired two of the IOM's most recent reports on mental health in the military. Dr. Galea serves frequently on advisory groups to national and international organizations. He formerly served as chair of the New York City Department of Health and Mental Hygiene's Community Services Board and as member of its Health Board. Galea's scholarship has been at the intersection of social and psychiatric epidemiology, with a focus on the behavioral health consequences of trauma, including those caused by firearms. He has published more than 800 scientific journal articles, 50 chapters, and 13 books, and his research has been featured extensively in current periodicals and newspapers. His latest book, Pained, was published by Oxford University Press in March 2020.
Galea trained as a physician at the University of Toronto. He went on to earn a master's degree in public health at Harvard T.H. Chan School of Public Health and a DrPH at Columbia University Mailman School of Public Health.

Academic career
Dr. Galea was named the dean of the Boston University School of Public Health effective January 1, 2015.

On January 1, 2010, Galea joined the Mailman School as the Chair of the Department of Epidemiology and as the Anna Cheskis Gelman and Murray Charles Gelman Professor of Epidemiology. Under the leadership of Galea, the Department of Epidemiology reorganized and consolidated its work in its core area areas of strength, building its research and teaching portfolio in chronic disease, infectious disease, injury, lifecourse, psychiatric/neurological, and social epidemiology. The Department also launched several new cross-cutting programs, including the Global Mental Health Program, efforts aimed at translation of public health research and educational initiatives, including the Epidemiology and Population Health Summer Institute and the Executive MS program.

Prior to his tenure at Columbia, he was on the faculty at both the University of Michigan School of Public Health and Medical School. He also held a leadership position at the New York Academy of Medicine.

Research
In his own scholarship, Dr. Galea is centrally interested in the social production of health of urban populations, with a focus on the causes of brain disorders, particularly common mood-anxiety disorders and substance abuse. He has published extensively about social epidemiology, health inequalities, and the health of vulnerable populations. He has long had a particular interest in the consequences of mass trauma and conflict worldwide, including as a result of the September 11 attacks, Hurricane Katrina, conflicts in sub-Saharan Africa, and the American wars in Iraq and Afghanistan. Dr. Galea has conducted research in 18 countries. This work has been principally funded by the National Institutes of Health, Centers for Disease Control and Prevention, and several foundations. He has published more than 800 scientific journal articles, 50 chapters and commentaries, and 18 books, and his research has been featured extensively in current periodicals and newspapers. His work has been cited more than 50,000 times and he has an h-index of >100 on Google Scholar. He has been invited to present his work in 30 countries and 30 U.S. states. In 2019, his book "Well: What we need to talk about when we talk about health", published by Oxford University Press, was his first book aimed at a general audience.

Editorial work
Sandro Galea has served on the editorial boards or been associate editor of several journals including Epidemiology, American Journal of Epidemiology., Bulletin of the World Health Organization, Journal of Urban Health, the International Journal of Drug Policy, and Depression and Anxiety. He served as guest Editor-in-Chief for the American Journal of Epidemiology's centennial issue in 2019.

Books
Galea S, Vlahov D, eds. Handbook of Urban Health: Populations, methods, and practice. Springer Science and Business Media Publishers; 2005. 
Freudenberg N, Galea S, Vlahov D, eds. Cities and the health of the public. Vanderbilt University Press; 2006. 
Norris F, Galea S, Friedman M, Watson P. Methods for Disaster Mental Health Research. Guilford Press; 2006. 
Galea S, ed. Macrosocial determinants of population health. Springer Science and Business Media Publishers; 2007. 
Neria Y, Galea S, Norris FH, eds. Mental health and disasters. Cambridge University Press; 2009. 
Cohen N, Galea S, eds. Population mental health: Evidence, policy, and public health practice. Routledge; 2011. 
Rudenstine S, Galea S. The causes and behavioral consequences of disasters: Models informed by the global experience 1950–2005. Springer; 2011.
Koenen KC, Rudenstine S, Susser E, Galea S. A lifecourse approach to mental disorders. Oxford University Press; 2013. 
Keyes KM, Galea S. Epidemiology matters: A new introduction to methodological foundations. Oxford University Press; 2014.
Keyes KM, Galea S. Population health science. Oxford University Press; 2016. 
El-Sayed AM, Galea S. Systems science and population health. Oxford University Press; 2017. 
Kaplan GA, Diez Roux AV, Simon C, Galea S. Growing inequality. Bridging complex systems, population health, and health disparities. Westphalia Press; 2017. 
Galea S. Healthier: Fifty thoughts on the foundations of population health. Oxford University Press; 2017.
Galea S. Well: What We Need to Talk About When We Talk About Health. Oxford University Press; 2019.
Sullivan L, Galea S. Teaching Public Health. Johns Hopkins University Press; 2019.
Stein M, Galea S. Pained: Uncomfortable Conversations about the Public's Health. Oxford University Press; 2020.

Selected awards
University of Toronto Faculty of Medicine Dean's 25th Anniversary Alumni Award (2019)
Society for Epidemiologic Research Distinguished Service Award (2019)
Columbia University Mailman School of Public Health Allan Rosenfeld Alumni Award for Excellence (2017)
Honorary Doctor of Science – University of Glasgow, Scotland (2015)
Rema Lapouse Award – American Public Health Association (2015)
National Academy of Medicine – Elected Member (2012)
Society for Epidemiologic Research – Elected President (2011)
American Epidemiological Society – Elected Member (2008)
Health Policy Investigator Award – Robert Wood Johnson Foundation (2006)
New York Academy of Medicine – Elected Fellow (2004)

References

1971 births
Living people
American epidemiologists
American public health doctors
Columbia University Mailman School of Public Health alumni
Harvard School of Public Health alumni
University of Toronto alumni
Boston University School of Public Health faculty
Columbia University faculty
Members of the National Academy of Medicine